The Mayan Theater in Los Angeles, California is a landmark former movie palace and current nightclub and music venue.

History
The Mayan Theater opened in August 1927 as a performance arts theater.

Leon Hefflin Sr. rented out the Mayan Theater downtown Los Angeles to produce the Sweet N' Hot, "Greatest Negro All Star Musical to Hit Coast." His business partner was Curtis Mosby, and the featured performer was Dorothy Dandridge. The show had a run of eleven weeks and was reported as going to New York. It closed to rave reviews and was covered by 20 different newspapers all over the country.

From 1971 to 1989, the theater was owned by pornographic filmmaker Carlos Tobalina. In the 1980s, the theater showed pornographic films.

The theater has been a location in many films, including Sally of the Scandals, The Bodyguard, Save the Tiger, Unlawful Entry, Rock 'n' Roll High School, and A Night at the Roxbury. It also featured in the eighth episode of the first season of GLOW.

In 1990, the Mayan Theater, with most of its lavish ornament intact, became a nightclub and music venue. It is designated as a Historic Cultural Monument.

In 2022, Daft Punk also streamed a video recording of a show at the Mayan Theater in Los Angeles from their 1997 Daftendirektour.

Architecture and design
Designed by Stiles O. Clements of Morgan, Walls & Clements, the façade of the Mayan Theater includes stylized pre-Columbian patterns and figures designed by sculptor Francisco Cornejo. This was his major work.

The Mayan Theater is a prototypical example of the many ornate exotic revival-style theaters of the late 1920s, Mayan Revival in this case. The well-preserved lobby is called "The Hall of Feathered Serpents," the auditorium includes a chandelier based on the Aztec calendar stone, and the original fire curtain included images of Mayan jungles and temples.

Gallery

See also
List of Los Angeles Historic-Cultural Monuments in Downtown Los Angeles

References

External links

 

Movie palaces
Adult movie theaters
Cinemas and movie theaters in Los Angeles
Music venues in Los Angeles
Theatres in Los Angeles
Buildings and structures in Downtown Los Angeles
Los Angeles Historic-Cultural Monuments
Theatres completed in 1927
1927 establishments in California
Morgan, Walls & Clements buildings
Mayan Revival architecture